The 1908–09 Kansas Jayhawks men's basketball team represented the University of Kansas in its eleventh season of collegiate basketball, and its second in the Missouri Valley Intercollegiate Athletic Association, or MVIAA. The team would go on to win its second MVIAA Conference Championship. They finished the season 25–3. The head coach was Phog Allen, serving in his second and final year of his first tenure. Thomas Johnson was retroactively named an All-American by the Helms Foundation, making him the first Jayhawk to earn the honor.

Roster
Ralph Bergen
Robert Heizer
Thomas Johnson
Verne Long
Donald Martindell
George McCune
Carl Rouse
Earl Woodward

Schedule

References

Kansas Jayhawks men's basketball seasons
Kansas
Kansas
Kansas